Pink Suit Blue Day is the debut album by Australian rock band Eurogliders, released in 1982. Their debut single, "Without You", was released in June and entered the top 40 of the Australian Kent Music Report singles chart. A follow-up single, "Laughing Matter" in September did not chart.

At the 1982 Countdown Music Awards, the album was nominated for Best Debut Album.

Background
Guitarist and singer, Bernie Lynch fronted (as Rip Torn) a new wave band, The Stockings, in Perth, Western Australia in the late 1970s. He left in early 1980 to form Living Single with Crispin Akerman on guitar, Don Meharry on bass guitar, Guy Slingerland on drums and Amanda Vincent on keyboards. Lynch's domestic partner, UK-born vocalist, Grace Knight joined the group soon afterwards. By the end of 1981, drummer John Bennetts replaced Slingerland and the band changed their name to Eurogliders. They were signed by manager, Brian Peacock, to their first recording and publishing contracts with Polygram. They then recruited Melbourne bass player Geoff Rosenberg to replace Meharry.

In late 1981, Eurogliders traveled to the Philippines capital Manila, to record their first album, Pink Suit Blue Day, produced by Englishman Lem Lubin. It did not enter the top 50 of the Australian Kent Music Report albums chart. They released their first single, "Without You", in June which entered the top 40 on the Kent Music Report singles chart. A follow-up single, "Laughing Matter" in September did not chart into the top 50.

Track listing

Charts

Personnel
Eurogliders members
 Crispin Akerman – guitar
 John Bennetts – drums, percussion
 Grace Knight — vocals, saxophone, keyboards
 Bernie Lynch – vocals, guitar, keyboards 
 Geoff Rosenberg – bass guitar
 Amanda Vincent – keyboards

References

1982 debut albums
Eurogliders albums
Mercury Records albums